Till Death (Arabic: للموت) is a Lebanese drama which has aired since 2021.

Plot 
The marriage of Reem and Hadi is on the rocks. Reem remains silent and Hadi, on a business trip, has his life turned around when he meets a spontaneous woman.

Cast 

 Maguy Bou Ghosn as Sahar
 Daniella Rahme as Reem
 Mohammed Al-Ahmad as Hadi
 Khaled Al Qish as Basil
 Bassem Moughnieh as Omar

Release 
The show's first and second season were released on Shahid and Netflix. The third season is being shot currently and planned to air on TV during Ramadan 2023.

Reception 
The show received high viewer ratings during its first broadcast in 2021.

See also 

 Till Death (disambiguation)

References 

Lebanese television series